Epistemology of finance is a field of study that aims at providing a conceptual framework for the interpretation of mathematical models in finance, in order to determine the epistemological standards according to which financial theory must be assessed. Subjects covered include the study of financial crisis as well as the epistemology of financial reporting.

It is closely related to philosophy and economics.

See also 
 Philosophy of accounting
 Philosophy and economics
 Christian Walter (in French)

References

Further reading 
 
 
 
 
 

Financial economics